Galianora bryicola is a species of jumping spider (family Salticidae) from Ecuador.

Males are about 4 mm long, adult females are not yet known. This species is brown with a generalized salticid body form. The carapace is brown to black with a pale central longitudinal stripe on the thorax. The back of the abdomen is medium brown with indistinct speckling, the underside is black.

One male was collected on a tree trunk, several juveniles were collected by beating moss-covered branches and tree trunks in the understorey of lowland rainforest.

Name
The species name refers to the habitat of mossy tree trunks: bryicola means "dwelling on moss".

References

Salticidae
Invertebrates of Ecuador
Spiders of South America
Spiders described in 2006